ASN Neuro is a peer-reviewed open access scientific journal covering neurochemistry. It is published by  SAGE Publications on behalf of the American Society for Neurochemistry, of which it is the official journal. The founding editor-in-chief was Anthony Campagnoni (University of California, Los Angeles), who was succeeded by Monica Carson (University of California, Riverside), and then in 2018 by Douglas L. Feinstein (University of Illinois, Chicago).

Abstracting and indexing 
The journal is abstracted and indexed in Science Citation Index Expanded, BIOSIS Previews, Scopus, and Index Medicus/MEDLINE/PubMed. According to the Journal Citation Reports, the journal has a 2017 impact factor of 3.617

References

External links 
 

Neuroscience journals
Bimonthly journals
Publications established in 2009
English-language journals
SAGE Publishing academic journals